Mushroom is the second studio album by Eatmewhileimhot. It was released digitally on March 2, 2012. Unlike their debut album, a physical version was not released. This is the first album that Caleb Denison is not featured on. The album received mostly negative reviews. Music videos were released for each of the four singles.

The album is influenced mainly by several genres of metal rather than the punk genres that the band's earlier material is composed of.

Track listing

Personnel
Christofer Drew Ingle – vocals, guitar, programming
Taylor MacFee – bass
Hayden Kaiser – drums

References

2012 albums
Eat Me Raw albums